This is a list of events held and promoted by House of Hardcore, a professional wrestling promotion based in the United States. HOH's first event, "House of Hardcore I", took place on October 6, 2012 in Poughkeepsie, New York at the Mid-Hudson Civic Center.

List of events

Results

House of Hardcore

The inaugural House of Hardcore was held in Poughkeepsie, New York at the Mid-Hudson Civic Center with an attendance of 1,950 people. The founder of House of Hardcore Tommy Dreamer would take on Carlito Colón and Mike Knoxx in the main event for the FWE Championship. The show also included special appearances by Spike Dudley, Rick Steiner, Adam Copeland, Raven and The Sandman. Maryse Ouellet and Thea Trinidad were in attendance for the pre-show meet & greet.  Commentary was provided by Vic Travagliante, Jordan Schneider and (After match 4) Winter.

House of Hardcore 2

House of Hardcore 2 was held in Philadelphia, Pennsylvania at the National Guard Armory. The founder of House of Hardcore Tommy Dreamer would take on Lance Storm in the main event, a feud that had been building up over Twitter.  The show included special appearances by Spike Dudley, The Blue Meanie, The Sandman and Sean Waltman. Ric Flair and J. J. Dillon signed autographs before the show.  Commentary was provided by Vic Travagliante, Jordan Schneider and Danny Doring.

House of Hardcore 3

House of Hardcore 3 was held in Poughkeepsie, New York at the Mid-Hudson Civic Center. The founder of House of Hardcore Tommy Dreamer and Terry Funk teamed together in a tag team match against Lance Storm and Sean Waltman, with the match also being the last time Dreamer and Funk would team together at a House of Hardcore event.  After the main event, Bully Ray made a surprise appearance attacking Funk and Dreamer and challenging Dreamer to a match at TNA PPV One Night Only: Old School. The show included special appearances by The Blue Meanie, The Sandman and Beulah McGillicutty.  Appearing at the pre-show meet & greet was Ted DiBiase, Ted DiBiase Jr., Maryse Ouellet, Velvet Sky and J. J. Dillon.  Commentary was provided by Vic Travagliante, Jordan Schneider, Danny Doring (Until the battle royal) and Matt Striker (After match 4).  This show aired on Twitch on November 11, 2018.

House of Hardcore IV

House of Hardcore IV was a professional wrestling event that took place in Poughkeepsie, New York on June 6, 2014.  The original main event was Team 3D vs Tommy Dreamer & Abyss, but Bully Ray was pulled last minute by TNA.  After a scathing promo, Abyss joined by Rhino turned on Dreamer setting up the new main event.  The promo led to Dreamer/HOH being featured on Impact Wrestling through the summer. The show included special appearances by The Sandman and Spike Dudley.  Appearing on the pre-show meet & greet was The Godfather, Tammy "Sunny" Sytch and Mindi O'Brien.  Commentary was provided by Vic Travagliante, Jordan Schneider, Danny Doring (Until match 7) and Matt Striker (After match 7).  This show also featured a surprise punishment of Brian "Q" Quinn for the show Impractical Jokers.

House of Hardcore V

House of Hardcore V was a professional wrestling event that took place at National Guard Armory in Philadelphia, Pennsylvania. This House of Hardcore event featured AJ Styles taking on Kevin Steen in the main event and Bad Influence (Christopher Daniels and Frankie Kazarian) taking on Tony Nese and Petey Williams in the co-main event. The event also showed founder Tommy Dreamer fighting "The Monster" Abyss in a Monster's Ball match due to the events from the previous show.  The Sandman also made a special appearance on the show with Beulah McGillicutty appearing on the pre-show meet and greet.  Commentary was provided by Vic Travagliante, Jordan Schneider and Matt Striker.

House of Hardcore VI

House of Hardcore VI (also known as House of Hardcore VI: The West Coast Invasion) was a professional wrestling event featuring of an attendance of 750 people. The event saw the founder of House of Hardcore Tommy Dreamer taking on Matt Hardy and Carlito in a Tables, Ladders, and Chairs Match. The Young Bucks (Matt and Nick Jackson) took on The Addiction (Christopher Daniels and Frankie Kazarian) in the main event. The show also included special appearances by The Nasty Boys (Brian Knobbs & Jerry Sags) and The Sandman. Before the show American Icon Autographs held a convention that featured Ric Flair, Bill Goldberg, Dennis Rodman, Roddy Piper, Lita, Zeus and others. After the show, Piper held a live edition of Piper's Pit podcast.  Commentary was provided by Vic Travagliante and (Joining during match 8) Matt Striker.  This show was broadcast on Twitch on December 23, 2018.

House of Hardcore VII

House of Hardcore VII was a professional wrestling internet pay-per-view (iPPV) event produced by House of Hardcore. It took place on November 16, 2014 at the 2300 Arena (formerly known as the ECW Arena) in Philadelphia, Pennsylvania. Tommy Dreamer's original opponent was Ethan Carter III (due to their TNA feud) but he missed the show due to injury; instead the fans got a surprise TNA World Title match. The show included special appearances by Ricardo Rodriguez, Alberto El Patron, CW Anderson, The Sandman, Velvet Sky, Spike Dudley and Thea Trinidad. House of Hardcore VII was also the last appearance for Tommy Dreamer's wife Beulah McGillicutty as a valet.  Commentary was provided by Vic Travagliante and Matt Striker.  This show aired on Twitch on January 20, 2019.

House of Hardcore 8

House of Hardcore 8 was a professional wrestling internet pay-per-view (iPPV) event produced by House of Hardcore. It took place on March 7, 2015 at the 2300 Arena in Philadelphia, Pennsylvania. Before the event, several names in professional wrestling signed autographs for the fans. This included Barbie Blank, Melina, Mike Rotunda, Lanny Poffo, Ashley Massaro, Magnum T. A., Earl Hebner and several more. Building up to the event, Tommy Dreamer and Eric Young would feud on Impact Wrestling leading up to the House of Hardcore VIII internet pay-per-view.  This event featured a tribute to Mikey Whipwreck from his students and the fans.  The show featured appearances by Justin Roberts, Thea Trinidad, Velvet Sky, Ethan Carter III and Rey Mysterio.  Commentary was provided by Vic Travagliante and Daniel Morrison.  This show was broadcast on Twitch on March 31, 2019.

House of Hardcore 9

House of Hardcore 9 was a professional wrestling event produced by House of Hardcore, which was taped for The Fight Network. It took place on July 18, 2015 at the Ted Reeve Arena in Toronto. It was the ninth event in the House of Hardcore promotion and included special appearances by Jessicka Havok and Spencer Rice. House of Hardcore 9 also marked the final wrestling appearance of Traci Brooks.  Commentary was provided by Vic Travagliante and Daniel Morrison.  This show was broadcast on Twitch on September 23, 2018

House of Hardcore 10

House of Hardcore 10 was a professional wrestling internet pay-per-view (iPPV) event produced by House of Hardcore, which took place on November 13, 2015 at the 2300 Arena in Philadelphia, Pennsylvania. House of Hardcore 10 also included appearances by Pepper Parks, Cherry Bomb, Chris Mordetzky, Sabu, Melissa Coates and The Sandman. The event also marked the induction of Dean Malenko and Eddie Guerrero into the 2300 Arena Hardcore Hall of Fame.  Commentary was provided by Vic Travagliante and Daniel Morrison.

House of Hardcore 11

House of Hardcore 11 was a professional wrestling event produced by House of Hardcore, which took place on November 14, 2015 at the Elmcor Center in Corona, Queens, New York. The event hosted the final match of the Dirty Heels tag team, as Austin Aries would debut for WWE's NXT brand in January 2016.  The event featured appearances by Pepper Parks and Cherry Bomb.  Commentary was provided by Vic Travagliante and Daniel Morrison.

House of Hardcore 12

House of Hardcore 12 was a professional wrestling event which took place on April 15, 2016 at the Elmcor Center in Corona, Queens, New York. The show included the HOH debuts of Billy Gunn and Brian Cage, as well as the HOH return of Sami Callihan. The show also included appearances by The Blue Meanie, Shane Douglas, Danny Doring and Joel Gertner, who joined with Tommy Dreamer, Rob Van Dam and Rhino in the ring to pay tribute to the recently deceased ECW alumnus Balls Mahoney.  This event was a rare time when the Pro Wrestling NOAH GHC Tag Team Titles were defended outside Japan.  Commentary was provided by Vic Travagliante and Daniel Morrison.

House of Hardcore 13

House of Hardcore 13 was a professional wrestling event which took place on April 16, 2016 at the 2300 Arena in Philadelphia, Pennsylvania. Like the previous show, HOH 13 included a tribute to recently deceased wrestler Balls Mahoney. This event featured a rare defense of Pro Wrestling NOAH's GHC Tag Team Titles outside Japan.  The event also included appearances by SoCal Val, Ricky Steamboat, Vik Dalishus, The Double Duprees, Kevin Thorn, Sean Waltman and The Sandman. Before the show, Icons of Wrestling held a convention which featured Shawn Michaels, Kurt Angle, Sean Waltman, Bobby Heenan and others.  Commentary was provided by Vic Travagliante and Daniel Morrison.

House of Hardcore 14

House of Hardcore 14 was a professional wrestling event produced by House of Hardcore, which took place on May 7, 2016, at the Scotiabank Convention Center in Niagara Falls, Ontario, Canada. This event was a part of the MindiO Fitness Extravaganza, which took place earlier in the day. The main event featured an all-Ontario match-up with Bobby Roode vs. Eric Young, which was both men's last show before joining WWE's NXT brand.  Commentary was provided by Vic Travagliante and Daniel Morrison.

House of Hardcore 15

House of Hardcore 15  (also known as House of Hardcore – Melbourne, while being promoted international as House of Hardcore – Australian Invasion and domestically as Outback Championship Wrestling presents House of Hardcore) was a professional wrestling event produced by House of Hardcore and Australian Promotion Outback Championship Wrestling, which took place on Friday June 24, 2016 at the Whitehorse Club in East Burwood, Melbourne, Australia. It was announced on Tuesday June 7, 2016 that all seated tickets were sold out and only standing room tickets remained. The event included appearances by Lisa Marie Varon, Carlito, Mickie James, Mark Cometti and Bull James. However, due to travel issues, both MVP & Magnus were unable to enter Australia.  Commentary was provided by Vic Travagliante and Daniel Morrison.

House of Hardcore 16

House of Hardcore 16 was a joint professional wrestling event produced by House of Hardcore and Reality of Wrestling, which took place on August 6, 2016 at the Pasadena Convention Center in Pasadena, Texas. Proceeds for House of Hardcore 16 went to support the Bustin' for Autism charity. Before the event Icons of Wrestling held a convention with appearances by Vickie Guerrero, Booker T, Brother Love, One Man Gang, Gene Snitsky and others.  Commentary was provided by Vic Travagliante and Daniel Morrison.

House of Hardcore 17

House of Hardcore 17 was a professional wrestling event produced by House of Hardcore, which took place on September 16, 2016 at The Sports Arena in St. James, New York.  This event featured an appearance by The Sandman.  Terry Funk made a special appearance at the pre-show meet & greet  Commentary was provided by Vic Travagliante.

House of Hardcore 18

House of Hardcore 18 was a professional wrestling event produced by House of Hardcore, which took place on September 17, 2016 at 2300 Arena in Philadelphia, Pennsylvania. The Dreamer/Hardy main event had been built up on Twitter after Dreamer showed support for Jeff Hardy in his TNA feud with his brother Matt.  After the main event, Bully Ray made the Dreamer/Hardy rematch in a Steel Cage for HOH 22.  The event also included appearance by Santino Marella, Terry Funk, Ryback, Joey Styles, Beulah McGillicutty, Raven, The Sandman, and Bully Ray. Before the show Icons of Wrestling held a convention with Sting, Bret Hart, The Steiner Brothers, Ted Dibiase and others appearing. Commentary was provided by Vic Travagliante and Daniel Morrison.

House of Hardcore 19

House of Hardcore 19 was a professional wrestling event produced by House of Hardcore, which took place on October 14, 2016 at The Odeon in Cleveland, Ohio. Even though Bill Carr was suspended, he competed at the show due to being previously advertised.  The event also included appearances by The Sandman and Bully Ray. Commentary was provided by Vic Travagliante. 
The event was also the first time a currently contracted TNA wrestler faced a currently contracted WWE wrestler faced a HOH contracted wrestler with Ethan Carter III going against Rhino and Tommy Dreamer in a "No Politics, No BS, Just Wrestling" match.

House of Hardcore 20

House of Hardcore 20 was a professional wrestling event co-produced by House of Hardcore and International Wrestling Cartel, which took place on October 15, 2016 at Court Time Sports Center in Elizabeth, Pennsylvania.  The event featured appearances by The Sandman and Bully Ray.  This show was Rhino's last HOH show before going full-time with WWE.  Commentary was provided by Vic Travagliante.

House of Hardcore 21: Blizzard Brawl

House of Hardcore 21: Blizzard Brawl was a professional wrestling event produced by House of Hardcore, which took place on December 3, 2016 at Waukesha County Expo in Waukesha, Wisconsin. This was the first HOH show broadcast on FloSlam.  The event also included appearances by Ryback, Swoggle, Benjamin Boone and The Sandman.  Commentary was provided by Vic Travagliante.  The main event was non-sanctioned by House of Hardcore.  It was the final match for the former promotion that promoted Blizzard Brawl (Great Lakes Championship Wrestling) and the cage match settled the feud that ended GLCW (The match is a FloSlam exclusive).

House of Hardcore 22

House of Hardcore 22 was a professional wrestling event produced by House of Hardcore and broadcast on FloSlam, which took place on December 16, 2016 at 2300 Arena in Philadelphia, Pennsylvania. The card included the final independent match for Tony Nese, who had recently signed with WWE. This show featured the first HOH sanctioned Steel cage match.  The event also included appearances by Matt Striker, Bull James, Katred, Bill Carr, The Sandman and Brother Nero.  Commentary was provided by Vic Travagliante and Daniel Morrison.

House of Hardcore 23

House of Hardcore 23 was a professional wrestling event produced by House of Hardcore and broadcast on FloSlam, which took place on December 17, 2016 at the MCW Arena in Joppa, Maryland. The event also included appearances by Nikolai Volkoff, "Baltimore Brawler" Steve Lombardi, and The Sandman. This event was supposed to feature James Ellsworth teaming with Tommy Dreamer, but his WWE commitment forced Dreamer to find a new partner. This show took place during a harsh ice storm.  Commentary was provided by Vic Travagliante and Daniel Morrison in what was Travagliante's last show before signing with WWE.

House of Hardcore 24

House of Hardcore 24 was a professional wrestling event produced by House of Hardcore and broadcast on FloSlam, which took place on April 21, 2017 at the Metuchen Sportsplex in Metuchen, New Jersey. The event also included appearances by "Broken" Matt Hardy, Velvet Sky and The Sandman. The original main event was Hardy vs Tommy Dreamer, but Hardy's WWE contract forced him from the match.  He was replaced by The Squad and Bully Ray was pulled from his match with Sami Callihan to team with Dreamer.  Commentary was provided by Matt Camp and Daniel Morrison.

House of Hardcore 25

House of Hardcore 25 was a professional wrestling event produced by House of Hardcore and broadcast on FloSlam, which took place on April 22, 2017 at the 2300 Arena in Philadelphia. Originally The Hardys were pulled from wrestling on this show due to signing with WWE, but last minute negotiations allowed them to participate in their advertised match. The event featured appearances by Ricky Steamboat, The Blue Meanie, Velvet Sky, The Sandman, Kenny and Mikey. Before the show Icons of Wrestling held a convention with Ric Flair, Kevin Nash, Scott Hall, Christian, Rey Mysterio and others attending.  Commentary was provided by Matt Camp and Daniel Morrison.

House of Hardcore 26

House of Hardcore 26 was a professional wrestling event produced by House of Hardcore and broadcast on FloSlam, which took place on May 19, 2017 at the Sports Arena in St. James, New York. The show featured Cody Rhodes facing Tommy Dreamer for the first time and Ethan Carter III answering Bully Ray's open challenge.  The event also included appearances by Velvet Sky, Mick Foley and The Sandman.  Commentary was provided by Matt Camp and Daniel Morrison.

House of Hardcore 27

House of Hardcore 27 was a professional wrestling event produced by House of Hardcore and Aussie All Pro, which took place on June 16, 2017 at the Brisbane Exhibition Ground in Bowen Hills, Brisbane, Queensland, Australia. The event also included appearances by The Young Bucks, Jake Hager, Bull James, and MVP along with a number of Australian talent.

House of Hardcore 28

House of Hardcore 28 was a professional wrestling event produced by House of Hardcore and Aussie All Pro, which took place on June 17, 2017 at the Sydney Showground in Sydney, New South Wales, Australia.  Before the show, the HOH roster appeared at Supanova Comic Con. This event featured appearances by Young Bucks, Colt Cabana, Jake Hager, Matt Cross and others.  Surprise appearances were made by Carlito and The Squad. This event had its broadcast debut on Twitch on February 18, 2018.  Commentary was provided by Matt Camp and Daniel Morrison.

House of Hardcore 29

House of Hardcore 29 was a professional wrestling event produced by House of Hardcore and Aussie All Pro, which took place on June 18, 2017 at the Cyril Jackson Rec Centre in Bassendean, Perth, Western Australia.  This event featured appearances by Young Bucks, MVP, Billy Gunn, Colt Cabana and others.  Surprise appearances were made by Carlito and The Squad.

House of Hardcore 30

House of Hardcore 30 was a professional wrestling event produced by House of Hardcore and Aussie All Pro, which took place on June 23, 2017 at the Whitehorse Club in East Burwood, Melbourne, Victoria, Australia.  It featured appearances by Colt Cabana, Billy Gunn, Jake Hager, MVP and others.  Surprise appearances were made by Carlito and The Squad.

House of Hardcore 31

House of Hardcore 31 was a professional wrestling event produced by House of Hardcore and Aussie All Pro, which took place on June 24, 2017 at the Marion Leisure & Fitness Centre in Morphettville, Adelaide, South Australia.  It featured appearances by Carlito, Jake Hager, Swoggle, MVP, Colt Cabana and others.

House of Hardcore 32

House of Hardcore 32 was a professional wrestling event which took place on August 11, 2017 at iPlay America in Freehold, New Jersey.  The event featured appearances by Rock 'n' Roll Express (Ricky Morton and Robert Gibson) and The Sandman as well as the debut of Matthew Robles as the biased Federal Athletic Representative.  Commentary was provided by Matt Camp and Daniel Morrison.

House of Hardcore 33

House of Hardcore 33 was a professional wrestling event that took place on August 12, 2017 at the 2300 Arena in Philadelphia, Pennsylvania.  Before the show Road Warrior Animal, Dan Severn, The Patriot, Ted Dibiase, The Blue Meanie and The Killer Bees appeared at the meet and greet.  The event featured appearances by Velvet Sky, Angelina Love, The Sandman, Shane Douglas, Matthew Robles and Chris Payne. The show was the first HOH show that featured no advertised matches and it was the final HOH match for Bobby Fish before he joined NXT. Earlier in the day Icons of Wrestling held a convention which featured Jim Ross, Jerry Lawler, Mr. Anderson, Chavo Guerrero Jr. and others.  Commentary was provided by Matt Camp and Daniel Morrison.

House of Hardcore 34

House of Hardcore 34 was a professional wrestling event that took place on November 17, 2017 at The Sports Arena in St. James, New York. Ace Romero, Willie Mack and The Luchasaurus made their debuts at the event, while Austin Aries made his HOH return after leaving WWE.  Commentary was provided by Matt Camp and Daniel Morrison.

House of Hardcore 35

House of Hardcore 35 was a professional wrestling event that took place on November 18, 2017 at the 2300 Arena in Philadelphia, Pennsylvania.  It was the first HOH event to air live on Twitch.  The event featured appearances by Eddie Kingston, Matthew Robles, Shane Douglas and The Sandman as well as the HOH debut of Matt Riddle.  Before the event Tommy Dreamer, Nick Aldis and NWA World Champion Tim Storm filmed a segment for Billy Corgan's National Wrestling Alliance.  After the Twitch portion of the event ended, Dreamer and Sandman were attacked by Jay Briscoe & Mark Briscoe, continuing Bully Ray and Dreamer's feud with them from Ring of Honor. Earlier in the day, Icons of Wrestling held a convention which featured The New Age Outlaws, Larry Zbyszko, Big Van Vader, Raven and others.  Commentary was provided by Matt Camp and Daniel Morrison.

House of Hardcore 36: Blizzard Brawl Homecoming

House of Hardcore 36: Blizzard Brawl Homecoming was a professional wrestling event produced by House of Hardcore and broadcast on Twitch, which took place on December 2, 2017 at Waukesha County Expo in Waukesha, Wisconsin.  This show featured Candice Michelle wrestling in her final match. This event featured appearances by Brian Stiffler and Matthew Robles as well as Angelina Love and Monique Dupree on the Twitch post-show.  Commentary was provided by Dameon Nelson and Daniel Morrison.

House of Hardcore 37

House of Hardcore 37 was a professional wrestling event produced by House of Hardcore and broadcast on Twitch, which took place on January 26, 2018 at the 2300 Arena in Philadelphia, Pennsylvania.  The event featured appearances by The Blue Meanie, The Sandman and Matthew Robles.  Before the show, Jake Roberts, Velvet Sky, Gene Okerlund and Terri Runnels appeared at the Meet & Greet.  Other than the tag match, this event consisted entirely of First Round matches in the HOH Twitch Television Championship Tournament, with the Second Round taking place March 24 at the 2300 Arena.  Commentary was provided by Matt Camp and Daniel Morrison.

House of Hardcore 38

House of Hardcore 38 was a professional wrestling event produced by House of Hardcore, which took place on March 23, 2018 at The Sports Arena in St. James, New York.  The event featured an appearance by Matthew Robles and a defense of the NWA World Heavyweight Championship.  Austin Idol, Flip Gordon, Sam Adonis, Trey Miguel and Clayton Gainz made their HOH debuts at this event.  Commentary was provided by Matt Camp and Daniel Morrison.

House of Hardcore 39

House of Hardcore 39 was a professional wrestling event produced by House of Hardcore and broadcast on Twitch, which took place on March 24, 2018 at the 2300 Arena in Philadelphia, Pennsylvania.  The event featured appearances by Bully Ray and Joey Mercury.  This show featured Second Round matches in the HOH Twitch Television Championship Tournament, though injuries to Dan Maff, Luchasaurus and Austin Aries's Impact Wrestling commitment forced some matchup changes.  The HOH Twitch Television Championship was unveiled on this show and it was awarded on April 7, 2018 at House of Hardcore 40.  This show represented the first NWA World Heavyweight Championship match at 2300 Arena since August 27, 1994 when Shane Douglas threw down the title in favor of ECW.  Commentary was provided by Matt Camp and Daniel Morrison.

House of Hardcore 40

House of Hardcore 40 was a professional wrestling event produced by House of Hardcore and broadcast on Twitch, which took place on April 7, 2018 at the Sugar Mill in New Orleans, Louisiana.  This event featured the Semi-final and Final matches in the HOH Twitch Television Championship Tournament with Willie Mack being crowned the first champion in the promotion's history.  The title's first defense was on May 18, 2018 at House of Hardcore 42.  This event which took place in conjunction with WrestleCon and Impact Wrestling happened at midnight during Wrestlemania 34 weekend.  Commentary was provided by Matt Camp and Daniel Morrison.

House of Hardcore 41

House of Hardcore 41 was a professional wrestling event co-produced by House of Hardcore and Wrestling For Warriors, which took place on April 28, 2018 at the Grand Wayne Convention Center in Fort Wayne, Indiana.  This show was a "Hardcore for Charity" event which benefited children's charities in the area.  The Moose/Kong and Edwards/Callihan matches were shown on the May 10 and 17 episodes of Impact Wrestling's Impact! respectively. This show was shown on Twitch on July 1, 2018.  Commentary was provided by Joe Nebroski and Marcus Mann.

House of Hardcore 42

House of Hardcore 42 was a professional wrestling event produced by House of Hardcore in conjunction with Chaotic Wrestling, which took place on May 18, 2018 at the Starland Sportsplex in Hanover, Massachusetts.  This event was HOH's debut in Massachusetts. Matthew Robles made an appearance on this event, which also featured the first HOH Twitch Television Championship defense.  Commentary was provided by Matt Camp and Daniel Morrison.

House of Hardcore 43

House of Hardcore 43 was a professional wrestling event produced by House of Hardcore, which took place on May 19, 2018 at the 2300 Arena in Philadelphia, Pennsylvania.  The Moose/Drake match and the Edwards heel turn on Dreamer were shown on the June 14 and 28 episodes of Impact Wrestling's Impact! respectively. Barbie Blank and Matthew Robles made appearances on this show. This event aired on Twitch on July 29, 2018.  Commentary was provided by Matt Camp and Daniel Morrison.

House of Hardcore 44

House of Hardcore 44 was a professional wrestling event co-produced by House of Hardcore and Chinlock Wrestling, which took place on June 1, 2018 at the Lennox Agricultural Memorial Community Centre in Napanee, Ontario.  This event was the first time the HOH Twitch Television Championship was defended outside the US.  This show featured a musical performance by Solomon Woodland.

House of Hardcore 45

House of Hardcore 45 was a professional wrestling event produced by House of Hardcore, which took place on June 2, 2018 at the Massena Arena in Massena, New York.

House of Hardcore 46

House of Hardcore 46 was a professional wrestling event produced by House of Hardcore, which took place on July 11, 2018 at the Gate One Theatre at Claremont Showground in Claremont, Perth, Western Australia.  This event featured a defense of the NWA World Heavyweight Championship and the HOH Twitch Television Championship marking that title's first defense in Australia.  Surprise appearances were made by Swoggle and Lance Archer.

House of Hardcore 47

House of Hardcore 47 was a professional wrestling event produced by House of Hardcore, which took place on July 13, 2018 at the Melbourne Pavilion in Kensington, Melbourne, Victoria, Australia.  This event featured a defense of the NWA World Heavyweight Championship and the HOH Twitch Television Championship.  Surprise appearances were made by Swoggle and Lance Archer with Mick Foley appearing as part of his 20 Years of Hell comedy tour.

House of Hardcore 48

House of Hardcore 48 was a professional wrestling event produced by House of Hardcore, which took place on July 14, 2018 at the Hurstville Entertainment Centre in Hurstville, Sydney, New South Wales, Australia.   This event featured a defense of the NWA World Heavyweight Championship and the HOH Twitch Television Championship.  Surprise appearances were made by Swoggle and Lance Archer and an appearance by Mick Foley as a part of his 20 Years of Hell comedy tour.

House of Hardcore 49

House of Hardcore 49 was a professional wrestling event produced by House of Hardcore, which took place on July 15, 2018 at The Shed at Aussie World in Palmview, Sunshine Coast, Queensland, Australia.  This event featured a defense of the NWA World Heavyweight Championship and the HOH Twitch Television Championship.  Surprise appearances were made by Swoggle and Lance Archer and an appearance by Mick Foley as a part of his 20 Years of Hell comedy tour.

House of Hardcore 50

House of Hardcore 50 was a professional wrestling event produced by House of Hardcore, which took place on September 3, 2018 at the DeVault Vineyards in Concord, Virginia.  This event took place during the Blue Ridge Rock Festival.  The Sandman and New Jack made appearances on this show.

House of Hardcore 51: Blizzard Brawl-For It All

House of Hardcore 51: Blizzard Brawl-For It All was a professional wrestling event produced by House of Hardcore, which took place on December 1, 2018 at Waukesha County Expo in Waukesha, Wisconsin.  This show featured the last ever Hardcore War between Tommy Dreamer and Abyss as well as appearances by Sean Waltman and Road Warrior Animal. This event featured the HOH debuts of Big Ca$$ and Eugene along with the pro wrestling debut of Kal Herro.

House of Hardcore 52: Indie Darlings

House of Hardcore 52: Indie Darlings was a professional wrestling event that took place on December 8, 2018 at the 2300 Arena in Philadelphia, Pennsylvania.  This event featured defenses of the NWA World Heavyweight Championship, HOH Twitch Television Championship and the NWA National Heavyweight Championship.  Appearances on this show were made by Vik Dalishus, Hale Collins, The Sandman, Bully Ray and Tommy Dreamer with Big Ca$$, Gail Kim, D'Lo Brown and Rebel appearing on the Meet & Greet.  Commentary was provided by Matt Camp and Daniel Morrison.  Earlier in the day, Icons of Wrestling held a convention with Jeff Jarrett, Renee Young, Lenny Dykstra and others appearing.  During the intermission, Big Ca$$ would suffer a seizure that required a trip to a hospital for him.

House of Hardcore for Charity

House of Hardcore for Charity was a professional wrestling event produced by House of Hardcore, which took place on December 15, 2018 at the Woodbridge High School in Woodbridge, New Jersey.  This show was a charity show that raised money for the Woodbridge High School athletic department.  This show featured talent with local connections including Robert Strauss who taught at the school and Danny Doring who attended the school.  SiriusXM Busted Open Radio host Dave Lagreca made his debut as a referee in the main event.

House of Hardcore 53

House of Hardcore 53 – Farewell to the Fairgrounds was a professional wrestling event co-produced by House of Hardcore and Overdrive Pro Wrestling, which took place on June 1, 2019 at the Tennessee State Fairground Sports Arena in Nashville, Tennessee.  This show was the final wrestling show at the fairgrounds before they are torn down for redevelopment.  James Storm and Michael St. John made appearances on this event.  Willie Mack, Johnny Impact and Taya Valkyrie were originally scheduled but missed the show due to travel difficulties.  Footage of Moose attacking Tommy Dreamer was shown on the June 28, 2019 episode of Impact!.

House of Hardcore 54

House of Hardcore 54 – A Night You Can't Mist was a professional wrestling event co-produced by House of Hardcore and Impact Wrestling, which took place on June 8, 2019 at the 2300 Arena in Philadelphia, Pennsylvania.  This event was broadcast on Impact Plus and Fite. This show had appearances by Melissa Santos, Jimmy Jacobs, The Sandman, Joey Ryan and D'Lo Brown with Brian Cage and The Blue Meanie appearing on the preshow Meet & Greet.  Commentary was provided by Josh Mathews and Scott D'Amore.  The match between Joey Ryan and Billy Gunn didn't take place due to Gunn having travel difficulties.  This event featured title defenses of the HOH Twitch Television Championship and the Impact Knockouts Championship.  Earlier in the day, Icons of Wrestling held a convention with Bret Hart, Scott Hall, Harley Race, Pentagón Jr. and others appearing.

House of Hardcore 55

House of Hardcore 55 – Digital Destruction was a professional wrestling event co-produced by House of Hardcore and Impact Wrestling, which took place on June 9, 2019 at The Sports Arena in St. James, New York.  This event was broadcast on Impact Wrestling's Twitch channel. This event had appearances by Melissa Santos and Jimmy Jacobs with Josh Mathews and Scott D'Amore performing commentary.  The Great Muta, Brian Cage and Monique Dupree appeared on the preshow Meet & Greet.  This show featured title defenses of the HOH Twitch Television Championship and the Impact X Division Championship.

House of Hardcore Chinlock For Charity

House of Hardcore Chinlock For Charity was a professional wrestling event produced by House of Hardcore and Chinlock Wrestling, which took place on June 15, 2019 at Leon's Centre in Kingston, Ontario.  This show was a charity show that raised money for the Youth Diversion and other local charities.  This event had an appearance by The Sandman.  Bret Hart, Mark Henry, Lex Luger, Tully Blanchard, Jimmy Hart and Tugboat appeared on a legends meet & greet.  This show featured title defences of the HOH Twitch Television Championship, Chinlock Heavyweight Championship and the crowning of the inaugural Kale Murphy Memorial Championship.

House of Hardcore 56

House of Hardcore 56 was a professional wrestling event produced by House of Hardcore, which took place on November 23, 2019 at the 2300 Arena in Philadelphia, Pennsylvania.  This show had appearances by Masahiro Chono and Stan Hansen with Magnum T. A., Nikita Koloff, J. J. Dillon and The Blue Meanie appearing on the preshow Meet & Greet.  This event featured a title defense of the Impact X Division Championship as well as talent from AEW, Impact, MLW and ROH.  This show is notable for HOH Twitch Television Champion Willie Mack's first pinfall loss in HOH in a non-title match and the debut of Vik Dalishus on commentary joining Daniel Morrison.  Earlier in the day, Icons of Wrestling held a convention with Sid Vicious, Ron Simmons, Brutus Beefcake, Jordynne Grace and others appearing.  The X Division Title Match aired on the January 14, 2020 episode of Impact Wrestling's Impact!

House of Hardcore 57: Blizzard Brawl "Challenge of The SuperFriends"

House of Hardcore 57: Blizzard Brawl was a professional wrestling event produced by House of Hardcore and Great Lake Championship Wrestling, which took place on December 7, 2019 at Waukesha County Expo in Waukesha, Wisconsin.   This event featured talent from AEW, Impact, MLW and ROH.  The Godfather, Rikishi, and Monique Dupree appeared on the preshow meet & greet.

House of Hardcore 58
House of Hardcore 58 was originally scheduled to take place on April 11, 2020, however it was cancelled due to the COVID-19 pandemic in the United States.

Upcoming shows

References

Professional wrestling-related lists
Professional wrestling shows